Ravninny is a rural locality (a settlement) and the administrative center of Chilekovskoye Rural Settlement, Kotelnikovsky District, Volgograd Oblast, Russia. The population was 906 as of 2010. There are 10 streets.

Geography 
Ravninny is located 40 km northeast of Kotelnikovo (the district's administrative centre) by road. Chilekovo is the nearest rural locality.

References 

Rural localities in Kotelnikovsky District